Starr Nunatak is a  nunatak marking the north side of the mouth of Harbord Glacier, on the coast of Victoria Land, Antarctica. Mapped by United States Geological Survey (USGS) from surveys and U.S. Navy air photos, 1957–62. Named by Advisory Committee on Antarctic Names (US-ACAN) for James W. Starr, U.S. Navy, steelworker at McMurdo Station, 1966 and 1967 summer seasons.

Nunataks of Victoria Land
Scott Coast